is a railway station in Katsuragi, Nara Prefecture, Japan.

Lines
Kintetsu Railway
Minami Osaka Line

Layout
The station has  two side platforms and two tracks.

Adjacent stations

Railway stations in Japan opened in 1929
Railway stations in Nara Prefecture